James Dudley Simon (January 30, 1897 – October 23, 1982) was a Louisiana politician who served on the Louisiana Supreme Court from 1955 to 1960.

Biography
Born in St. Martinville, St. Martin Parish, Louisiana, Simon graduated from the Tulane University Law School in 1918 and then served in World War I. He served in the Louisiana State Senate from 1921 to 1925, and was thereafter a district court judge from 1925 to 1941, when he received a temporary appointed to the Orleans Court of Appeals until 1942. Simon was elected to the state supreme court in January 1955, and retired on August 23, 1960.

References

1897 births
1982 deaths
Louisiana state court judges
Louisiana lawyers
People from St. Martinville, Louisiana
Cajun people
Louisiana State University alumni
Tulane University Law School alumni
United States Army personnel of World War I
Louisiana state senators
United States Army officers
Justices of the Louisiana Supreme Court
20th-century American judges
Burials in Louisiana
20th-century American politicians
20th-century American lawyers